Daniel Slater (born 20 April 1966) is a British theatre and opera director.

Biography 
Slater was born in London. He did his undergraduate degree at Bristol University and went on to do a PhD at Corpus Christi College, Cambridge.
 The Bartered Bride (Opera North) (1998)

External links 
 Personal website
 Agent's website
 Agent's website

1966 births
Living people
British opera directors
Alumni of Corpus Christi College, Cambridge